Wa'alan is a sub-district located in Bilad Ar Rus District, Sana'a Governorate, Yemen. 8526 people were counted in the population of Wa'alan in the 2004 census.

References 

Sub-districts in Bilad Ar Rus District